Daum may refer to:

People
Ahron Daum (born 1951), Israeli-born Modern-Orthodox rabbi, educator, and author
Andreas Daum (active from 1995), German-American historian
Auguste Daum (1853–1909), French ceramist
Christoph Daum  (born 1953), German football coach
Gerhard Daum (born 1956), German composer
Kevin Daum, author, columnist, entrepreneurship coach, marketer and speaker
Léon Daum (1887–1966), French mining engineer
Margaret Daum (1906–1977), American classical soprano
Meghan Daum (born 1970), American author, essayist, and journalist
Menachem Daum, Orthodox Jewish documentary film-maker
Mike Daum (born 1995), American college basketball player for South Dakota State University
Norbert Daum (born 1948), Austrian musician and conductor
Paulus Adrianus Daum (1850–1898), Dutch author
Rob Daum (born 1958), Canadian ice hockey coach
Robert Daum, founding  Director of Iona Pacific Inter-religious Centre
Werner Daum, German diplomat

Other
Daum (web portal), a South Korean web portal
Daum (studio), a crystal studio in Nancy, France